Sułoszowa  is a village in Kraków County, Lesser Poland Voivodeship, in southern Poland. It is the seat of an administrative district called Gmina Sułoszowa.

The village had a population of 5,800 in 2013.

References

Villages in Kraków County
Kielce Governorate
Kielce Voivodeship (1919–1939)